Monica Seles was the defending champion and successfully defender her title, by defeating Gabriela Sabatini 6–2, 6–0 in the final.

Seeds

Draw

Finals

Top half

Bottom half

References

External links
 Official results archive (ITF)
 Official results archive (WTA)

Nichirei International Championships
1992 WTA Tour